The Arkenu structures, also known as the Arkenu craters, are a pair of prominent circular geological structures in eastern Libya.

It has been argued that both structures were formed by simultaneous meteorite impacts. Field investigations by Dr. P. Paillou, Dr. A. Rosenqvist, and others reported the presence of impact breccias at the structures’ bottoms, shatter cones pointing toward the center of the structures, and microscopic planar deformation features (PDFs) found in quartz grains of sandstones outcropping in the structures. Based on these reports and other observations, it was proposed that both structures are extraterrestrial impact craters that were formed simultaneously as a double impact event less than 140 million years ago (Jurassic or younger). 

More recently, on the basis of field, petrographic, and textural observations, it has been argued that the Arkenu structures are not in fact extraterrestrial impact craters. Field studies found a lack of identifiable shatter cones at both structures. Instead, the striations which were previously reported as shatter cones were identified as ventifacts created by wind erosion in sandstones. These striations are surficial features that are unrelated to fracturing of the sandstone; are consistently oriented with the prevailing Holocene wind patterns; and occur within and outside of, even distal to, both of the Arkenu structures. In addition, detailed petrographic analyses of rock samples from both of the Arkenu structures found a lack of any microscopic effect of shock metamorphism including a lack of planar deformation features (PDFs) in quartz grains and evidence of impact melting, or presence of glass. A lack of any apparent differences between the sedimentary rocks outcropping inside and outside these circular structures was found. Finally, field observations found silicified sandstone dikes and igneous rocks, such as syenite, porphyries, tephrites and phonolites, and lamprophyres (monchiquites) directly associated with each circular feature. Based on these and other observations, it was concluded that the Arkenu structures are stocks of porphyritic syenitic that have intruded the Nubia Formation to form rather simple and eroded ring dike complexes. Hydrothermal activity that followed the intrusion of these ring dike complexes resulted in the formation of massive magnetite–hematite deposits and dikes of silicified sandstone. As a result of this research, the Arkenu structures were removed from and are currently not listed in the Earth Impact Database.

References

External links
Brügge, N. (2012) Remarks to the origin of the craters around Gilf Kebir and Djebel Uweinat (Egypt)and the supposed impact craters of Libya, Sahara Trekking.
Di Martino, M. (2010) Impact and non-impact craters in eastern Sahara INAF – Osservatorio Astronomico di Torino Talk of the "International Workshop on Paolo Farinella (1953-2000): the Scientists, the man", Pisa, 14–16 June 2010
Willis, K. J. (2008) Arkenu Craters, Libya : Image of the Day. Earth Observatory, EOS Project Science Office, NASA Goddard Space Flight Center, Greenbelt, Maryland.

Impact craters of Libya
Sahara